Kurdish:Gurê Sniper گورگی نيشان شكين )  is a fictional character from Konami's Metal Gear series. Created by Hideo Kojima and designed by Yoji Shinkawa, she appears in the 1998 stealth game Metal Gear Solid (as well as its 2004 remake, Metal Gear Solid: The Twin Snakes) as one of the game bosses opposing the protagonist Solid Snake and his ally Meryl Silverburgh.

The character is a ruthless and skilled sniper belonging to the renegade U.S. military special operations group FOXHOUND. "Sniper Wolf" is a nom de guerre pseudonym and her real name is undisclosed. She is of Kurdish origin and her backstory is connected to the series' chief protagonist/antagonist character Big Boss, who had rescued her in Iraq when she was a child.

Appearances

Metal Gear Solid

In Metal Gear Solid, Sniper Wolf is a member of FOXHOUND and an elite sniper capable of going without food and staying still for up to a week. She typically forms an emotional connection with her targets before killing them with her favoured weapon, the Heckler & Koch PSG1, and uses mercury-tipped hollow-point bullets to poison her victims. She is also addicted to the drug diazepam.

Born in present-day Iraqi Kurdistan around 1983 during the Iran–Iraq War, she witnessed the death of her family and thousands of others from a chemical attack by Saddam Hussein's government troops against the rebellious Kurds when she was five years old. She was captured by Saddam's forces and taken as an orphan by the Iraqi Ministry of Interior, who brainwashed her and brought a famed Gurkha sniper to train her to be a child combatant for the government. Three years later, during the 1991 uprisings in Iraq, she fled to a Kurdish refugee camp. There, the legendary U.S. Army Special Forces veteran Big Boss noticed her extraordinary abilities and brought her with him to the United States, where she received counselling and deprogramming to remove her Iraqi brainwashing, leaving only her fighting abilities with her. Extremely grateful, she thought of Big Boss as a modern Saladin and followed him in whatever he did, until his mutiny and later death at the hands of FOXHOUND operative Solid Snake (as depicted in Metal Gear 2: Solid Snake). She was then found by Solid Snake's brother Liquid Snake, who convinced her to join a FOXHOUND splinter cell under his command.

In the alternate year 2005, during the Shadow Moses Island incident (Metal Gear Solid), Sniper Wolf goes rogue along with the rest of Liquid Snake's group when they take hostages and blackmail the U.S. government with a hijacked walking tank armed with nuclear weapons, demanding the corpse of Big Boss to be handed over to them. She cares for the huskies that Liquid intended to kill, as she enjoys their company, and is impressed with the hostage scientist Hal "Otacon" Emmerich giving his scarce food supply to the dogs. When Solid Snake (further referred to as Snake) infiltrates the island, Sniper Wolf wounds Snake's companion Meryl Silverburgh to lure him into a trap, capturing him so he could be tortured by another FOXHOUND member, Revolver Ocelot. Eventually, Snake defeats her in sniper duel in a snowy field by shooting her in the lung. After hearing Sniper Wolf's story of her life, and at her request to be at last "set free", Snake kills her over objections by Otacon, who professes his love for her. Solid Snake also uses her handkerchief to avoid attacks by her wolves by masking his scent with hers. Sniper Wolf's ghost can be seen if the player uses the in-game photo camera on her body.

Other appearances

Sniper Wolf was originally planned to make a voice-over cameo appearance in Metal Gear Solid 2: Sons of Liberty (2001), during a conversation between Otacon and Olga "Ninja" Gurlukovich, and appears in a short flashback sequence.  Her spirit shows up as a wolf in Metal Gear Solid 4: Guns of the Patriots (2008), in which an unrelated character named Crying Wolf also appears to engage in a sniper duel against Solid Snake. Sniper Wolf's costume can also be developed for the character Quiet in Metal Gear Solid V: The Phantom Pain.

A special Sniper Wolf character card appears in the non-canon spin-off game Metal Gear Acid 2 (2005). Some other developers have also given homage type nods to the character, such as with an item "MGS Sniper Wulf Mk. II" in EA Montreal's Army of Two (2008) and a weapon "MG-S1 Sniper Wolfe" in the PlayStation 3 version of Visceral Games' The Godfather II (2009).

A 1/8 scale Sniper Wolf action figure was released by McFarlane Toys in 1998. Two 1/6 scale figures were also released only in Japan by Yamato (an action figure) and Studio Saru Bunshitsu (a garage kit). In 2012, Sniper Wolf was chosen by Konami as one of their 64 iconic characters to participate in the Konami E3 Battle event, where she lost against Metal Gear REX in the semi-final fourth round. A "bishoujo statue" designed by Shunya Yamashita based on Shinkawa's original picture was released by Kotobukiya in 2016.

Conception and design
According to the Metal Gear series character artist Yoji Shinkawa, the idea of creating Sniper Wolf came about when the series' writer, director and producer Hideo Kojima originally asked him to draw "a guy", but Shinkawa suggested that he should instead design "a young lady with a sniper rifle." Shinkawa designed her with green hair, but she appears as a sandy blonde in the game; he also made a topless picture of her. Kojima said a part of an inspiration for the character came from the female Viet Cong sniper scene in the film Full Metal Jacket and recalled he had a hard time "trying to explain the concept of MGS Sniper Wolf battle" to his staff.

Asked about his favorite Metal Gear character in a 2003 interview, Solid Snake's voice actor David Hayter said: "Wolf. Very hot. Very dangerous. She’d be Snake’s girl if she wasn’t so focused on killing him." When he was asked in 2014 about his favourite Metal Gear moments, Kojima himself chose Wolf's death as the first scene to talk about. In 2019, Jordan Vogt-Roberts showed a concept art of Sniper Wolf's death scene while announcing his potential Metal Gear Solid film adaptation. He wrote: "Metal Gear is unique for the sorrow & loss you feel while 'winning'. The death of Sniper Wolf rocked me when I first experienced it. I wanted to capture that melancholy victory."

Reception
The character was well received in part because of her sex appeal. For that reason, Sniper Wolf ranked as 37th "hottest babe in games" by GameDaily in 2008 and was included in UGO's list of the 50 "hottest babes in games" in 2011. She was ranked as the tenth sexiest PlayStation character by PlayStation Universe in 2010, who added that "this character takes a special place in our hearts," and in 2014 was included among the top 10 "hottest" female villains in gaming and "old school hotties that still got it" by Cheat Code Central's Travis Huber, who stated that "she was so loved and talked about that Hideo Kojima and the gang have had to create yet another beautiful but deadly sniper character in the upcoming MGSV: The Phantom Pain."

Sniper Wolf was also acclaimed as one of the best boss type and antagonist characters in the Metal Gear series or even in all video games. In 2006, Ryan Stewart and Rich Krpata of The Boston Phoenix ranked the fight against Sniper Wolf as the 16th greatest boss battle in video game history, describing her as the best aspect of FOXHOUND and her death as "one of gaming's most poignant scenes." In 2008, readers of IGN voted her at the top position on the list of the Metal Gear series villains, the staff commenting: "Who else could number one be but the incredibly beautiful, and impossibly deadly, Sniper Wolf?" and adding that "it's safe to say Wolf earned more votes than just about every other villain combined, a fact that doesn't surprise us at all." That same year, IGN PlayStation Team ranked the fight against her as the sixth best boss battle in the series, while the staff of GameSpy placed her seventh on their list. In 2010, the staff of IGN ranked Sniper Wolf as the 92nd top video game villain of all time, stating that she "probably deserves to be higher on our list" and emphasizing the feeling of helplessness caused by her tactics in "an epic boss battle". In 2015, she was included on several lists of the best boss fights in the Metal Gear series, including by Sean Garmer of 411mania, Dustin Spino of Cinelinx, and the staff of IGN, chosen by Zach Ryan.

Regarding her personality issues, sometimes perceived as complicated, Sniper Wolf was ranked as the 25th top "chick behaving badly" in all entertainment by IGN's Scott Collura in 2008, featured as one of nine "bad girls of videogame land" by Gelo Gonzales of FHM in 2009, and ranked as the seventh top "bitch in games" by Gavin Mackenzie of PLAY in 2010. Complex ranked her as the ninth "most diabolical video game she-villain" in 2011, describing her as "the exact type of woman that you wouldn’t marry for any rational reason." In 2012, Complex ranked her as ninth on the list of some of the most evil women in video games, commenting that even as Sniper Wolf "actually ends up being one of the more noble villains in the game," she did exhibit "some next-level psycho behavior."

The scene of Sniper Wolf wounding Meryl to set a trap for Snake was included among the top ten cutscenes in the Metal Gear series by Jeremy M. Loss of Joystick Division in 2010 and ranked as the seventh most shocking surprise in video games ("subverting the power fantasy") by George Reith of GamingBolt in 2012. In Trigger Happy, Steven Poole noted how the "brilliantly manipulative" Metal Gear Solid can make the player feel guilty, even as "it makes no sense to wish that you hadn't killed Sniper Wolf — that is,  properly to regret your actions — because it is a task that the game demands be fulfilled before you can progress." In 2012, Ryan King of PLAY included the character of Sniper Wolf among the six "things you didn’t want to kill (but you did anyway)" and Ian Dransfield from the same magazine included her among the top "bad guys you wanted to win". In 2015, Aleksander Gilyadov from VentureBeat included Sniper Wolf's death among six most memorable Metal Gear moments opining it "still remains as one of the most poignant and beautiful scenes in the entire series. It also displays just how multilayered, benign, and well-written Kojima’s characters (both heroes and villains) really are."  That same year, Javy Gwaltney from Paste had this scene top his list of the saddest moments in Metal Gear.

On the other hand, 1UP.com's Scott Sharkey placed Otacon's reaction to the death of Sniper Wolf second on his 2009 list of the series' "most awkward" moments, calling it "the world's most embarrassingly stupid case of Stockholm syndrome." Shacknews' Steve Watts wrote about the game's GameCube remake Metal Gear Solid: The Twin Snakes: "While critically acclaimed thanks to its improved graphics and smarter AI, the addition of an MGS2-inspired first-person mode was blamed for making the game too easy and ruining the Sniper Wolf boss battle entirely."

See also
List of characters in the Metal Gear series
Women warriors in literature and culture

References

External links
Sniper Wolf at Giant Bomb
Sniper Wolf at the Internet Movie Database

Characters designed by Yoji Shinkawa
Fictional criminals in video games
Female characters in video games
Fictional American people in video games
Fictional drug addicts
Fictional female assassins
Fictional female military personnel
Fictional marksmen and snipers
Fictional immigrants to the United States
Fictional Iraqi people
Fictional Kurdish people
Fictional United States Army Special Forces personnel
Konami antagonists
Metal Gear characters
Orphan characters in video games
Fictional soldiers in video games
Video game bosses
Video game characters introduced in 1998
Woman soldier and warrior characters in video games